Carl H. Storck (born November 14, 1892 – March 13, 1950) was a co-founder of the National Football League (NFL), as well as the founding owner of the Dayton Triangles. He was also the Triangles coach from 1922 until 1926. Storck served as the NFL's secretary-treasurer from 1921 to 1939 and president from 1939 to 1941.

Dayton Triangles
Storck started his football career as a local football hero in Dayton, Ohio, playing for St. Mary's College (now known as the University of Dayton). After graduation, Stork played semi-pro football for a local team that would later become the Dayton Triangles. Storck became the team's manager in 1918 and guided his team into the NFL (then called the American Professional Football Association). He represented Dayton at Ralph Hay's Hupmobile dealership on September 17, 1920. This meeting marked the formation of the NFL. The Triangles would have trouble competing in the increasingly competitive NFL, and Storck would eventual sell them in 1930 to Bill Dwyer, who moved the team to Brooklyn and renamed them the Brooklyn Dodgers.

League officer
Storck served as secretary-treasurer of the National Football League from 1921 to 1939. Upon the death of Joe Carr, Storck served as president of the National Football League. In 1941 the league created the position of Commissioner and named Elmer Layden to the post. Storck was upset by the owners' decision to replace him as head of the league, as he had given twenty years to the league (fifteen without pay) and had not received any criticism from the owners during his tenure as president. He stated that he would stay on as president if the owners defined his duties in a contract. However, on April 4, 1941, he suddenly announced that he was resigning "for the best interests of the game".

Outside football
In keeping with the majority of managers Storck was an unpaid volunteer. He worked full-time as a foreman in the Inspection and Packing Department of the National Cash Register Company. He then worked as assistant manager at Delco.

Illness and death
At the time of his resignation, Storck was seriously ill with Neurasthenia. He had been bedridden for seven weeks prior to his resignation and was partially paralyzed on the right side of his body. He retired from Delco in 1942 due to ill health. Storck died on March 13, 1950, at a nursing home in Dayton.

References

Sports Encyclopedia
Carl Stork: Pro Football Pioneer
The NFL: Professional Football Organized

1892 births
1950 deaths
Dayton Flyers football players
Dayton Triangles coaches
National Football League founders
National Football League commissioners
NCR Corporation people
Sportspeople from Dayton, Ohio
Players of American football from Dayton, Ohio